MyB (Hangul: 마이비) was a South Korean girl group formed by Maroo Entertainment. The group debuted on August 25, 2015 with My Oh My and made a comeback on November 13, 2015 with Ddoddo, before the group officially disbanded on December 16, 2016, where Moonhee and Hayoon would re-debuted with Maroo Entertainment new girl group, BONUSBaby in January 2017.

Members
 Jookyung (주경）
 Heejoo (희주)
 U-Jung (유정)
 Moonhee (문희)
 G-won (지원)
 Hayoon (하윤)

Discography

Single albums

References

K-pop music groups
South Korean girl groups
South Korean dance music groups
Musical groups from Seoul
Musical groups established in 2015
2015 establishments in South Korea
Musical groups disestablished in 2016
2016 disestablishments in South Korea
South Korean pop music groups